Leon Zernitsky was born in Russia in 1949. He graduated from Moscow Polygraphic Institute (Moscow Fine Art and Design University),  one of the country’s premier art colleges, where he earned his MFA. Zernitsky enjoyed a successful career as illustrator and fine artist creating art for international magazines, book publishers and major corporations around the globe. His work has been exhibited at art galleries and fairs around the world and he has received numerous awards including: Communication Arts (USA), Print (USA), Applied Arts (Canada), CAPIC (Canada).

Although he is well-versed in classical methods of painting he likes to paint in tune with the spirit of great Russian avant-garde  artists. The influences of Chagall, Kandinsky, and Malevich that inspired his art is complemented by the diverse imagery, harmonious compositions, and intense colors. Leon enjoys experimentational art, and is continually expanding and developing his style and creative vision.

He now lives in Toronto, Ontario, Canada.

Sources
Art of Leon Zernitsky
 http://www.artofthechip.com/about_leon.html
 http://www.toronto.net/Artists_and_Performers.html
 https://archive.today/20130131030936/http://www.parkcitymagazine.com/Park-City-Magazine/Winter-Spring-2008/Java/
 http://www.artofthechip.com/home.html
 http://www.google.ca/search?q=leon+zernitsky&hl=en&tbo=1&tbs=bks:1&ei=T7pgTJOZOsP58AaEs5GpCg&start=0&sa=N
 http://www.spu.edu/depts/uc/response/autumn2k7/features/global-christianity2.asp
 http://www.artanddesignonline.com/Member_template/member_temp_portfolio.php?p=772&m=22744&bc=Browse&sub=21&v=products&pagename=browse_results_page2.php&PageSize=120&CurrentPage=2&sortBy=Title&TotalSize=&totalitems=522&L=1

1948 births
Living people
Russian illustrators
Russian emigrants to Canada